Debby Hodgkinson (born 22 November 1980) is a former rugby union player who played for . She was a member of the Australian squad that finished in third place in the 2010 Women's Rugby World Cup. She has also represented Australia in rugby sevens. She retired in 2012.

References

1980 births
Living people
Australia women's international rugby union players
Australian female rugby union players
Australian female rugby sevens players
Rugby union number eights
20th-century Australian women
21st-century Australian women